Pampuro is a surname. Notable people with the surname include:

 José Pampuro (1949–2021), Argentine politician
 Piervittorio Pampuro (1917–2007), Italian field hockey player